Larry Monroe Boyle (June 23, 1943–November 23, 2017) was a justice of the Idaho Supreme Court from 1989 to 1992.

Born in Seattle, Washington, and raised in Pocatello, Idaho, Boyle graduated from Pocatello High School in 1961 and was a missionary in Ireland for the Church of Jesus Christ of Latter-day Saints from 1964 to 1966. He then graduated from Brigham Young University in 1968 with a degree in economics, served in the U.S. Army, and received his J.D. from the University of Idaho College of Law in 1972.

Boyle entered the practice of law in Idaho Falls with the law firm of Hanson, Boyle, Beard and Martin, until 1986, when he was appointed to a seat on Idaho's 7th District bench. He also served as president of the 7th District Bar Association, and as a member of the Idaho Judicial Council, which made recommendations on the appointment of judges. While serving as a district judge, Boyle was called up to fill in on the Idaho Supreme Court on several occasions. In 1989, Governor Cecil Andrus appointed Boyle to the state supreme court, which was well-received even by political opponents of the governor. 

Boyle resigned from the court in March 1992 to become a U.S. magistrate judge, and retired in 2008.

See also

List of justices of the Idaho Supreme Court

References

External links
Memorial page

Justices of the Idaho Supreme Court
1943 births
2017 deaths
Brigham Young University alumni
University of Idaho College of Law alumni
Lawyers from Seattle
People with Parkinson's disease
American Mormon missionaries in Ireland
People from Pocatello, Idaho